The 1963–64 season was Newport County's second consecutive season in the Football League Fourth Division since relegation at the end of the  1961–62 season and their 36th overall in the Football League.

Season review

Results summary

Results by round

Fixtures and results

Fourth Division

FA Cup

Football League Cup

Welsh Cup

League table

References

 Amber in the Blood: A History of Newport County.

External links
 Newport County 1963-1964 : Results
 Newport County football club match record: 1964
 Welsh Cup 1963/64

1963-64
English football clubs 1963–64 season
1963–64 in Welsh football